Michel Larive (born 22 August 1966) is a French politician representing la France Insoumise. He was deputy for Ariège's 2nd constituency from 2017 to 2022.

In the 2022 French legislative election, he was the only La France Insoumise MP to lose his seat. He lost it to dissident candidate Socialist Party candidate Laurent Panifous.

See also
 2017 French legislative election

References

1966 births
Living people
Deputies of the 15th National Assembly of the French Fifth Republic
La France Insoumise politicians
Politicians from Paris
Politicians from Occitania (administrative region)